European Rover Challenge (ERC, ERC Space & Robotics) – an annual international Martian robots competition attended by teams from around the world. The competition has been organized since 2014 in Poland.

The ERC is the biggest robotics and space event in Europe addressed to the world of science and business, the new technologies sector as well as the general public. The European Rover Challenge, like the University Rover Challenge, is a part of the Rover Challenge Series.
The core of ERC is an international Martian robot competition (so-called Mars rover analogues) attended by students, graduates, and researchers from universities around the world. The teams consist of several people who work on a fully functional next-generation Mars robot for 12 months. Each team includes specialists in mechatronics, automation, robotics, autonomy, connectivity, and navigation. They come with departments connected with administrations, team management, promotion, and finances.

Traditionally, the competition is accompanied by events addressed to the wider public, such as the Inspiration Zone, lectures delivered by experts, and film screenings related to space. Those participants who are involved with the space sector can take part in workshops as well as substantive and mentoring meetings, panel discussions, and debates.

History 
In 2020, the ERC competition was carried out in a new remote formula, in which competitors from several continents remotely controlled a robot located on the Mars yard on the campus of the Kielce University of Technology in Poland.

Since 2021, the competition has been taking place both in the remote and on-site formulas.

*See Competition History below

Remote formula 
In the Remote Edition of the European Rover Challenge, the teams teleoperate and run their software on standardized equipment provided by the Organizer. It follows that every team competes using the same hardware and needs to show their skills in software development, mission planning, risk management and other soft skills.

During the Preparation Phase to the Challenge, the teams are given access to 3D models and technical documentation of the hardware and a basic software together with a simulation environment to be used for development. There are three Test Drives planned during the year during which the teams connect to the real-life equipment in a similar setup as used in the challenge to test their solutions.

Leo Rover mobile robot 
Leo Rover is a standard mobile robot used in the remote formula of the ERC since the 2020 edition. All the teams use the same rover in the competition and are able to run their own software dedicated to the Tasks operation.

Leo Rover is a 4-wheeled small-scale mobile robot that is 433 mm long by 447 mm wide by 249 mm in height and of a weight of 6.5 kg (7.8 kg with payload). The Rover runs on Ubuntu with ROS Melodic. In ERC Remote Edition, Leo Rover comes with a special payload allowing for autonomy implementation and Tasks performance together with network devices allowing for low-latency and high-bandwidth connection to the Internet.

Competition tasks (REMOTE) 
 Simulation Task – this task, together with the Preliminary Report, is considered as a part of the qualification process. Teams are expected to record a short screencast video (max. 2 minutes) showing:
 Leo Rover simulation: a short traversal of Leo Rover on the Mars Yard in Gazebo simulation showcasing skills such as driving with semi-autonomy, teleopertation with a controller, etc.
 Robotic Arm simulation: a short movement of UR3 Robotic Arm in the Robotic Cell.
 Science Task – the aim of the task is to prepare and execute a simple science-driven exploration plan on the Mars Yard (geological map of the Mars Yard including a coherent geological interpretation of the ‘landing site’; a short description of the geological history of the area; a hypothesis related to the geology of the Mars Yard that can be tested by taking a picture in a specific location on the Mars Yard)
 Navigation Task – the aim of the task is to navigate Leo Rover safely through Mars Yard, visit all waypoints and deliver dedicated probes to each of the waypoints.
 Maintenance Task – the essence of the task is to localize and turn off faulty elements of a device during its maintenance procedure and attach an additional sensor to the device outer shell to be able to monitor it in the future. The teams need to manipulate buttons located on the device panel, stick a sensor to the device case, check for faulty appliance, and turn off the appliance. The wide range of requirements indicates the difficulty of this task. ArUco markers are installed on each component to allow the teams and the software to recognize the right components and fixtures.
 Presentation Task – in this task, teams introduce themselves and present their projects. The Jury expects to learn how the team worked on the project, what kind of technical solutions are implemented in the rover (on-site formula) or in the software (remote formula), what the approach of the Team to solve particular tasks during the competition was (e.g., electro-mechanical design, algorithms for both on-site and remote formulas), and how the team solved problems and issues that had occurred during development (lessons learnt). Teams should also be prepared for a Q&A session and discussions with Judges.

On-site formula 
In the on-site formula, the teams work for twelve months on the preparation of a fully functional Martian robot according to the requirements set by the organizer. Each team includes specialists in mechatronics, automation, robotics, autonomy, communication and navigation. They are accompanied by departments related to administration, team management, promotion and finances.

The aim of the competition is to demonstrate and evaluate the achievements and proposed solutions. All tasks are designed to eliminate the "luck" factor, therefore, teams should carefully prepare to complete them.

Competition tasks (ON-SITE) 
 Science Task – the aim of the task is to prepare and execute a simple science-driven exploration plan on the Mars Yard (geological map of the Mars Yard including a coherent geological interpretation of the ‘landing site’; a short description of the geological history of the area; a hypothesis related to the geology of the Mars Yard that can be tested by taking a picture in a specific location on the Mars Yard)
Navigation Task – this task is intended to demonstrate the system's ability for semi- to fully autonomous traverse. The team has to develop a project which gradually evolves into a fully autonomous system, traversing and gathering important data on its way.
Probing Task – this task intends to demonstrate the ability of the system to place and collect probes from the rover's cache in the locations selected in the Science Task by the teams. Each team has to reach locations marked on the map, pick up the probes from their rover's on-board container and place them in the specified locations.
 Maintenance Task – the task is intended to demonstrate the ability of rovers in operating a variety of elements mounted on a panel. Each team has to use their rover's manipulating device to set switches to the required positions, measure electrical parameters, set other panel controls and observe indicators’ feedback.
 Presentation Task – in this task, teams introduce themselves and present their projects. The Jury expects to learn how the Team worked on the project, what kind of technical solutions are implemented in the rover (on-site formula) or in the software (remote formula), what the approach of the Team to solve particular tasks during the competition was (e.g., electro-mechanical design, algorithms for both on-site and remote formulas), and how the team solved problems and issues that had occurred during development (lessons learnt). Teams should also be prepared for a Q&A session and discussions with Judges.

The tasks are based on roadmaps – documents used in planning strategic missions of NASA and ESA. They are completed in the Mars Yard created from several tons of soil in the color resembling the surface of Mars. It includes natural obstacles copying the Martian landscapes.

Unlike other competitions of this kind, it is not allowed to use GPS during the ERC and team members do not see the robots they are navigating. They can only use their robot's camera view.

Competition history 
The European Rover Challenge has been organized since 2014. The plans to organize the first edition were announced at the International Space Week. From the very beginning, its originators expected the competition to have an international character and a wide range.

1st edition (5–7 September 2014) 
The first edition of the ERC took place at the Regional Science and Technology Centre in Chęciny near Kielce, Świętokrzyskie Voivodeship. The competition was attended by nine teams from Poland, Lithuania, India, Egypt, and Colombia. Among the guests, there was Professor Scott Hubbard, former head of NASA's Ames Research Centre, and Robert Zubrin, founder of the Mars Society.

Winners:       

 1st place: SCORPIO, Wrocław, Poland
 2nd place: IMPULS, Kielce, Poland
 3rd place: Lunar and Mars Rover Team, Cairo, Egypt

During the event, the Regional Science and Technology Centre, where the competition took place, was officially opened.

2nd edition (4–6 September 2015) 
The second edition of the ERC also took place at the Regional Science and Technology Centre. The competition was attended by 29 teams from the US, Australia, India, Colombia, the Netherlands, Egypt, Poland, Canada, and other countries. Specials guests of the second edition included the last man on the Moon, Apollo 17 astronaut, Harrison Schmitt, and writer Andy Weir (the meeting was conducted remotely).Winners:

 1st place: USST, Canada
 2nd place: Next, Białystok, Poland
 3rd place: McGill Robotics, Canada

3rd edition (10–12 September 2016) 
In 2016, the competition took place in Jasionka near Rzeszów, Subcarpathian Voivodeship. The competition was attended by 23 teams from Poland (15 teams), Australia, Canada, Bangladesh, India, Turkey, Nepal, and other countries.

An important event during the ERC 2016 was a Polish part of a civil debate on the future of space exploration organized by the European Space Agency. The debate took place in 22 countries at the same time and was attended by 2,000 people who were not involved with the space sector. They discussed such subjects such as space exploration, using its resources, and the growing importance of space. Its objective was to verify public opinion and the results were to be considered while developing future strategies of ESA.Winners:
 1st place: Raptors, Poland
 2nd place: Impuls, Poland
 3rd place: McGill Robotics, Canada

4th edition (14–15 September 2018) 

The fourth edition of the European Rover Challenge was organized in Starachowice, Świętokrzyskie Voivodeship, at the Museum of Nature and Technology. The competition was attended by 35 teams from 20 countries. The fourth edition of the challenge was accompanied by the biggest Science and Technology Show Zone in history. It attracted over 25,000 visitors. Among the guests, there was astronaut Tim Peake, Artemis Westenberg – President of Explore Mars Europe, Gianfranco Visentin, Head of Automation and Robotics Section at ESA, and Maria Antonietta Perino, Head of Advanced Exploration Programmes at Thales Alenia Space.

It was the first time when Pro Formula had been organized along with the competition. It was addressed to professionals from the space sector and constructors of space robots who wanted to test their constructions in the Mars Yard without participating in the challenge.

Winners:
 1st place: Impuls, Poland            
 2nd place: Raptors, Poland
 3rd place: Robotics for Space Exploration, Canada
 Jury Award: RoverOva, Czech Republic

5th edition (13–15 September 2019) 
The ERC 2019 took place at the Kielce University of Technology with over 40 teams qualified for the competition.

The fifth edition of the challenge was accompanied by the Mentoring and Business Conference attended by representatives of the space sector from Poland, Europe and the whole world, including Steve Jurczyk, Associate Administrator at NASA, Maria Antonietta Perino from Thales Alenia Space, Gianfranco Visentin and Pantelis Poulakis from ESA and Artemis Westenberg from Explore Mars Europe.

Winners:
1st place: Impuls, Poland           
2nd place: AGH Space Systems, Poland
3rd place: RoverOva, Czech Republic

6th edition (11–13 September 2020) 
The sixth edition of the ERC was held at the Kielce University of Technology. Over 60 teams from all over the world applied to participate in the competition. The 2020 edition was the first one to introduce the remote formula. The competition was conducted using the Freedom Robotics platform and Leo Rover mobile robots. A total of 33 teams qualified for the finals.

Winners:
 1st place: ERIG e.V., Germany
 2nd place: RoverOva, Czech Republic
 3rd place (ex aequo): DJS Antariksh, India, and Robocol, Colombia

Additional awards:
 Best Design Award: Best Design: AGH Space Systems, Poland
 Best Design Award: Best Docs: STAR Dresden e.V., Germany
 Best Design Award: Best Science Design: ERIG e.V., Germany
 Best Autonomy Navigation: RoverOva, Czech Republic
 Best Scientists: METU Rover, Turkey
 Best Science Planning: DJS Antariksh, India
 Best Planetary Map: Robocol, Colombia
 Best Analysis: RoverOva, Czech Republic
 Best Dexterity: RoboClyde, UK
 Best Presentation: AGH Space Systems, Poland
 Mathworks Special Prize: SKA Robotics, Poland

The 2020 edition was the first to be broadcast live on the organizer's website during the three days of the event. The guests of the ERC2020 industry conference were, among others:
 Natalia Lemarquis – United Nations Office for Outer Space Affairs Space4Women;
 Giuliana Rotola – European Southern Observatory; International Space University;
 Maria-Gabriella Sarah – European Space Agency;
 Gianfranco Visentin – European Space Agency;
 Douglas Terrier – National Aeronautics and Space Administration;
 Pascale Ehrenfreund – International Astronautical Federation; Space Policy Institute;
 Ken Davidian – Federal Aviation Administration.

7th edition (10–12 September 2021) 
The seventh edition of the ERC was held at the Kielce University of Technology. The 2021 edition was the first to be held in both on-site and remote formulas.

Winners:

 1st place (on-site): Impuls Team, Poland
 2nd place (on-site): ITU Rover Team, Turkey
 3rd place (on-site): EPFL Xplore, Switzerland
 1st place (remote): DJS Antariksh, India
 2nd place (remote): ERIG, Germany
 3rd place (remote): RoboClyde, UK

Additional awards:

 Best Navigation (on-site): AGH Space Systems, Poland
 Best Maintenance (on-site): ITU Rover Team, Turkey
 Best Science (on-site): EPFL Xplore, Switzerland
 Best Probing (on-site): EPFL Xplore, Switzerland
 Best Presentation (on-site): AGH Space Systems, Poland
 Best Navigation (remote): DJS Antariksh, India
 Best Maintenance (remote): ERIG, Germany
 Best Science (remote): DJS Antariksh, India
 Best Presentation (remote): Mars Rover Manipal, India

Selected speakers that appeared during the ERC 2021 live broadcast:

 Robert D. Cabana – NASA Associate Administrator;
 Robert Zubrin – Mars Society, Pioneer Astronautics;
 Annalisa Donati – EURISY;
 Chris Welch – International Space University;
 Maria Antonietta Perino – Thales Alenia Space;
 Grzegorz Wrochna – Polska Agencja Kosmiczna;
 Artemis Westenberg – Explore Mars Europe.

8th edition (9-11 September 2022) 
The eighth edition of the ERC was held at the Kielce University of Technology. Similar to the previous year's edition, the ERC 2022 was held in both on-site and remote formulas. 

Winners:

 1st place (on-site): AGH Space Systems, Poland
 2nd place (on-site): EPFL Xplore, Switzerland
 3rd place (on-site): ITU Rover Team, Turkey
 1st place (remote): DJS Antariksh, India
 2nd place (remote): Mars Rover Manipal, India
 3rd place (remote): Project RED, Italy

Additional awards:

 Best Performance NAVIGATION (on-site): EPFL Xplore, Switzerland
 Best Performance NAVIGATION (remote): IIT Bombay Mars Rover Team, India
 Best Performance MAINTENANCE (on-site): Frankfurt Robotics Science Team (FROST), Germany
 Best Performance MAINTENANCE (remote): Mars Rover Manipal, India
 Best Performance SCIENCE (on-site): ERIG, Germany
 Best Performance SCIENCE (remote): Mars Rover Manipal, India
 Best Performance PROBING: STAR Dresden, Germany
 Best Performance PRESENTATION (on-site): ITU Rover Team, Turkey
 Best Performance PRESENTATION (remote): Mars Rover Manipal, India

Bibliography

References

Mars rovers
Robotics competitions
Rover Challenge Series